Plascassier is located between Valbonne (2.8 km) and Grasse (7 km) and only 31 km away from Nice airport. Although bordered by several communes—Valbonne, Opio, Mouans-Sartoux and Châteauneuf-de-Grasse—it falls under the jurisdictional umbrella of Grasse.
French singer Édith Piaf died here on October 10, 1963.

References

Villages in Provence-Alpes-Côte d'Azur